Edward La Trobe Bateman (8 January 1816 – 30 December 1897) was a Pre-Raphaelite watercolour painter, book illuminator, draughtsman and garden designer.

Life
Bateman was probably born in Lower Wyke, Yorkshire, the son of John Bateman, a manufacturer, and his wife Mary (née) La Trobe. His brothers were John Frederick Bateman, the hydraulic engineer, and Christian Henry Bateman, an Anglican Church minister and a composer of hymns. His nephew Benjamin Latrobe was a notable architect, and a cousin Charles Latrobe was first lieutenant-governor of the colony of the state of Victoria in Australia.

In 1924, his grandson Charles La Trobe donated 12 artworks by Bateman to the state. The pencil sketches were of La Trobe's Cottage and its grounds.

Bateman had lived in London where he had been engaged to the daughter of William and Mary Howitt. When Bateman visited Australia, he stayed initially with Godfrey Howitt.

In 1856, the Carlton Gardens in Melbourne were redesigned and Edward la Trobe Bateman was engaged to do the designs. The path layout and other features were built, although limitations on funding for maintenance resulted in frequent criticism.

References

External links

Edward La Trobe Bateman (Dictionary of Australian Artists online)
Edward La Trobe Bateman: An Interesting Old-time Personality The Age
Edward LaTrobe Bateman: Prints and Printmaking, 71 works 

19th-century English painters
English male painters
English watercolourists
Pre-Raphaelite painters
English landscape and garden designers
1815 births
1897 deaths
Artists from Bradford
19th-century English male artists